Tenneru Halt railway station (station code:TNRU), is located in the village of Tenneru in Andhra Pradesh. It serves the villages of Tenneru and Manthena. It lies on the Vijayawada–Nidadavolu loop line and is administered under Vijayawada railway division of South Coast Railway zone

References 

Railway stations in Vijayawada railway division
Railway stations in Krishna district